Tony DeMeo (born July 5, 1948) is a former American football coach.  He served as the head football coach at Iona College in New Rochelle, New York from 1975 to 1978, Mercyhurst College—now known as Mercyhurst University—in Erie, Pennsylvania from 1981 to 1987, Washburn University in Topeka, Kansas from 1994 to 2001, and the University of Charleston in Charleston, West Virginia from 2005 to 2010.

DeMeo also worked as the offensive coordinator at Temple University (1988), James Madison University (1990), Murray State University (1992), and the University of Richmond (2002–2004). He was an assistant football coach at Pace University (1973–1974), the University of Pennsylvania (1979–1980), the University of Delaware (1989) and the University of Massachusetts Amherst (1991).

Coaching career
DeMeo began his head coaching career at his alma mater, Iona College. He compiled a 22–10–2 record at Iona and was twice named Metropolitan area coach of the year (1976 and 1977). DeMeo was inducted into the Iona College Hall of Fame in 1997 for his affiliation with two undefeated teams: first as a player in 1967 and then as the head coach in 1977.

DeMeo moved to the University of Pennsylvania in 1979 to serve as backfield coach for the Penn Quakers football team on the staff of head coach Harry Gamble.

In March 1981, DeMeo was hired as the first head coach for the new football team at Mercyhurst College—now known as Mercyhurst University. In seven seasons at Mercyhurst, he led the Lakers to a record of 41–21–2. DeMeo was named Eastern Intercollegiate Athletic Association Coach of the Year in 1985. He was inducted into the Mercyhurst University Hall of Fame in 2017.

DeMeo was the 39th head football coach at Washburn University in Topeka, Kansas, serving for eight seasons, from 1994 to 2001, and compiling  record of 31–54. His 31 wins are third-most among head coaches in Washburn's history, behind Ernest Bearg and Craig Schurig. After leading Washburn to a 6–5 record in 1999, the program's first winning season in over 10 years, and DeMeo was named Mid-America Intercollegiate Athletics Association (MIAA) Coach of the Year.

DeMeo coached at the University of Charleston in West Virginia from 2005 to 2010. His Golden Eagles finished the 2007 season with an 8–3 record and ranked ninth in the Northeast Region of Division II. Charleston tied for second place in the West Virginia Intercollegiate Athletic Conference (WVIAC).

Head coaching record

References

External links
 

1948 births
Living people
American football defensive backs
American football running backs
Charleston Golden Eagles football coaches
Delaware Fightin' Blue Hens football coaches
James Madison Dukes football coaches
Iona Gaels football coaches
Iona Gaels football players
Mercyhurst Lakers football coaches
Murray State Racers football coaches
Pace Setters football coaches
Penn Quakers football coaches
Richmond Spiders football coaches
Temple Owls football coaches
UMass Minutemen football coaches
Washburn Ichabods football coaches
People from Pelham, New York
Sportspeople from Westchester County, New York
Coaches of American football from New York (state)
Players of American football from New York (state)